Comedy Crackers is a Canadian comedy television series which aired on CBC Television in 1970.

Premise
This series was a follow-up to 1969's Comedy Cafe which was a local series that was brought to the national CBC network to fill in for the early cancellation Barris and Company. This new series followed a similar format as Comedy Cafe with its sketches whose themes often reflected the Canadian cultural divide between English and French. The same cast also returned, namely Barrie Baldaro, Dave Broadfoot, George Carron, Joan Stuart and Ted Zeigler. They were joined by the Harry Marks Orchestra and announcers Alec Bollini and Stanley Gibbons. Recurring sketches included "B & B Pub" with Baldaro and Carron as tavern owners, and "L'Anglaises" which was continued from Comedy Cafe with Carron and Stuart reprising their routine as a mixed-language couple.

Production
Comedy Crackers, like Comedy Cafe, was recorded at Montreal's Windsor Hotel in the Versailles Room.

Scheduling
This half-hour series was broadcast Wednesdays at 10:30 p.m. (Eastern) from 4 February to 16 September 1970.

References

External links
 
 

CBC Television original programming
1970 Canadian television series debuts
1970 Canadian television series endings
Television shows filmed in Montreal